Paola is a female given name, the Italian form of the name Paula. Notable people with the name include:

People

In arts and entertainment
Paola Del Medico (born 1950), Swiss singer
Paola e Chiara, pop music duo consisting of two sisters born in Milan, Italy
Paola Foka (born 1982), Greek singer
Paola Gaviria known as Power Paola (born 1977), Colombian-Ecuadorian cartoonist 
Paola Oliveira, Brazilian actress
Suzanne Paola (born 1956), American poet and author
Paola Rey (born 1979), Colombian actress
Paola Rojas (born 1976), Mexican television news personality
Paola Turbay (born 1970), Colombian actress
Danna Paola (born 1995), Mexican actress and singer
Paola Lázaro (born 1994), Puerto Rican actress and playwright

In politics 

Paola Balducci (born 1949), Italian politician and jurist
Paola Concia (born 1963), Italian politician
Paola De Micheli (born 1973), Italian politician
Paola Pabón (born 1978) Ecuadorian politician and feminist
Paola Pinna (born 1974), Italian politician
Paola Pisano (born 1977) Italian academic and politician
Paola Severino (born 1948), Italian politician
Paola Taverna (born 1969), Italian politician

In sports
Paola Cardullo (born 1982), Italian volleyball player
Paola Cavallino (born 1977), Italian swimmer
Paola Croce (born 1978), Italian volleyball player
Paola Duguet (born 1987), Colombian swimmer
Paola Ogechi Egonu (born 1998), Italian volleyball player
Paola Espinosa (born 1986), Mexican diver
Paola Longoria (born 1989), Mexican racquetball player
Paola Moro (born 1952), Italian long-distance runner
Paola Paggi (born 1976), Italian volleyball player
Paola Pezzo (born 1969), Italian mountain bike racer
Paola Reis (born 1999), Brazilian BMX rider
Paola Suárez (born 1976), Argentinian tennis player
Paola Vukojicic (born 1974), Argentinian field hockey player
Andrea De Paola (born 1990), Italian footballer

In other fields
Paola De Luca (born 1966), Italian designer
Paola del Medico (born 1950), Italian singer
Paola Drigo (1876–1938), Italian writer
Paola Flocchini, Italian-Canadian computer scientist
Paola Leone, Italian biologist
Paola Loreti, Italian mathematician
Paola Voci, academic specialising in Chinese language and culture
Queen Paola of Belgium (born 1937), Belgian queen consort
Paola (Maltese: Raħal Ġdid), a town in Malta

See also
Paolo

Italian feminine given names